Opinión is a newspaper published in Cochabamba, Bolivia.

References

External links
 Official Site

Newspapers published in Bolivia
Mass media in Cochabamba